No. 414 Squadron RCAF is a Royal Canadian Air Force squadron.  It is currently located in Ottawa and conducts electronic warfare support training for other units in the Canadian Armed Forces.

History

World War II
On 13 August 1941, No 414 Army Co-operation Squadron was formed at RAF Croydon, England, flying Westland Lysander and Curtiss Tomahawk aircraft.  On 28 June 1943 the squadron's name was changed to 414 Fighter Reconnaissance Squadron to reflect its role, and later known as 414 “City of Sarnia” Squadron (Sarnia Imperials). Throughout the Second World War the squadron was based at numerous airfields in England and in continentental Europe flying Supermarine Spitfire and North American Mustang aircraft.  During this period, the squadron provided photo reconnaissance, intelligence and ground attacks for both the Dieppe Raid and the allied Invasion of Europe.  It accounted for 29 enemy aircraft destroyed and 11 damaged, 76 locomotives and 12 naval vessels destroyed. After the war ended, the squadron disbanded at Lüneburg Airfield (Advanced Landing Ground B156), Germany on 7 August 1945.

Postwar
On 1 April 1947, No 414 Photographic Squadron was reformed at RCAF Station Rockcliffe. The squadron used the Douglas Dakota to photograph  of Canada's North.  When this task was completed it was disbanded on 1 November 1950.

On 1 November 1952 No 414 Fighter Squadron reformed at RCAF Station Bagotville.  The following summer on 24 August 1953 as part of "Leap Frog IV" the squadron moved to 4 Wing Baden-Soellingen flying the Canadair Mark.4 Sabre.  Four years later on 14 July 1957 the squadron disbanded to make room for the arrival of 419 Squadron flying the Avro Canada CF-100.

On 5 August 1957, the squadron reformed at RCAF Station North Bay where it operated as an all-weather fighter squadron flying the CF-100 Canuck and the McDonnell CF-101 Voodoo until 30 June 1964 when it was disbanded once more.

The squadron then reformed on 15 September 1967 at RCAF Station St Hubert in its new role as an electronic warfare squadron flying the CF-100.  In August 1972 the squadron moved to CFB North Bay where it remained for the next twenty years flying the CF-100, Dassault CC-117 Falcon and McDonnell EF-101B "Electric Voodoo".  In 1992 the squadron was split into two parts with one part going to CFB Comox as No 414 Composite Squadron and the other part going to CFB Greenwood as 434 Composite Squadron.  In 1993 the squadron changed its name to No 414 Combat Support Squadron when it was equipped with the Canadair CT-133 Silver Star.  The squadron was disbanded in 2002 when its duties were contracted out to a civilian company.

On 7 December 2007 approval was received for the squadron to stand up once more, this time as 414 EWS (Electronic Warfare Support) Squadron.  Belonging to the RCAF Aerospace Warfare Centre, the squadron is based in Ottawa and is composed of military Electronic Warfare Officers who fulfill the combat support role, flying on civilian contracted aircraft.

The squadron was re-formed at Gatineau Airport, Quebec, on 20 January 2009 to operate the Dassault/Dornier Alpha Jet provided by Top Aces Canada.

Badges

References

Royal Canadian Air Force squadrons
Canadian Forces aircraft squadrons
Military units and formations established in 1941
Canadian Article XV squadrons of World War II